The Calcutta Racket Club is a squash and racquet club in Kolkata, India. It was founded in 1793, making it one of  the oldest rackets clubs in the world, and the first in the subcontinent. Of its seven squash courts, two are glass-backed international standard tournament courts.

The Club is the administrative headquarters of The West Bengal Squash Racquet Association that is affiliated to the Squash Racket Federation of India. It has hosted the Kolkata International, an international squash tournament in 2005 and hosts all major squash activities and training in eastern India.

References

External links
 The club's website

Squash venues
1793 establishments in India
Squash in India
Sports venues in Kolkata
Sport in Kolkata
Sports clubs in Kolkata
1793 establishments in the British Empire